The 1985 Davis Cup (also known as the 1985 Davis Cup by NEC for sponsorship purposes) was the 74th edition of the Davis Cup, the most important tournament between national teams in men's tennis. 63 teams would enter the competition, 16 in the World Group, 27 in the Europe Zone, 12 in the Eastern Zone, and 8 in the Americas Zone. Cyprus made its first appearance in the tournament.

Sweden defeated West Germany in the final, held at the Olympiahalle in Munich, West Germany, on 20–22 December, to win their 2nd consecutive Davis Cup title and 3rd overall.

World Group

Draw

Final
West Germany vs. Sweden

Relegation play-offs

Date: 4–6 October

Americas Zone

  are promoted to the World Group in 1986.

Eastern Zone

  are promoted to the World Group in 1986.

Europe Zone

Zone A

  are promoted to the World Group in 1986.

Zone B

  are promoted to the World Group in 1986.

References
General

Specific

External links
Davis Cup Official Website

 
Davis Cups by year
Davis Cup
Davis Cup
German